This page summarises the Australia national soccer team fixtures and results in 2015.

Summary
As hosts, Australia won the AFC Asian Cup for the first time in January. The second half of the year saw qualification commence for the next World Cup and Asian Cup. By the end of the year Australia was sitting at the top of the qualification group with two games yet to be played. They were to finish 2015 ranked 57 in the FIFA rankings after falling to an all-time low of 100 at the end of 2014.

Record

Match results

Friendlies

Asian Cup

World Cup and Asian Cup qualifiers

Player statistics
Correct as of 17 November 2015 (v. ).
Numbers are listed by player's number in AFC Asian Cup, WC&AFC Qualification or last friendly played

References

External links
 Australia: Fixtures and Results

Australia national soccer team seasons
2015 national football team results